Skaff, or Scaff may refer to:

Skaff
Skaff Bloc, a Lebanese parliamentary bloc led by Myriam Skaff
Skaff Elias, American game designer
Doug Skaff, American politician from West Virginia
Elias Skaff (born 1948), former Lebanese politician and Member of Parliament
Joseph Skaff, former Lebanese politician and Member of Parliament
Frank Skaff (1910–1988), baseball infielder, coach, manager and scout in American Major League Baseball
Joseph J. Skaff (born 1930), major general in the United States Army
Kevin Skaff, member of American rock band A Day to Remember from Florida

Scaff
Estádio Jacy Scaff, usually known as Estádio do Café, a football stadium in Londrina, Paraná, Brazil
Jorge Saade-Scaff, or just Jorge Saade, Ecuadorian violinist
Julian H. Scaff, American artist, filmmaker, and designer

See also
Skaf (disambiguation)